Martti Johannes Suntela (3 January 1903 in Padasjoki – 21 July 1999) was a Finnish agronomist, farmer and politician. He was a member of the Parliament of Finland from 1948 to 1951, representing the Agrarian League.

References

1903 births
1999 deaths
People from Padasjoki
People from Häme Province (Grand Duchy of Finland)
Centre Party (Finland) politicians
Members of the Parliament of Finland (1948–51)